Lethbridge Dragon Boat Festival is a dragon boat festival held annually in Lethbridge, Alberta, Canada.

Overview 
The festival, held every July since 2002 at Henderson Park (except 2020), attracts over 60 teams from British Columbia, Alberta, Saskatchewan, and Montana consisting of over 1600 participants.  The three-day festival is the largest dragon boat festival in Alberta,  and it includes not only the dragon boat races but entertainment, vendors, and beer gardens.

2020 saw the festival go on hiatus until 2021.

See also
  
List of festivals in Lethbridge
List of festivals in Alberta

References

External links
Lethbridge Dragon Boat Festival

Sport in Lethbridge
Dragon boat racing
Water sports in Canada
Boat festivals
2002 establishments in Alberta
Recurring sporting events established in 2002
Festivals in Lethbridge